HMS Kingston was a 60-gun fourth-rate ship of the line of the Royal Navy, built by Frame in Hull and launched on 13 March 1697. She had an eventful career, taking part in numerous engagements.

Career

During the War of Spanish Succession, Kingston took part in the engagements of Gibraltar (1704) under the command of Edward Acton, Vélez Málaga (1709) and Gaspé (1711).

She was present at Wager's Action a naval confrontation on 8 June 1708 N.S (28 May O.S.), between a British squadron under Charles Wager and the Spanish treasure fleet, as part of the War of Spanish Succession.

She was rebuilt for the first time according to the 1706 Establishment at Portsmouth Dockyard, and relaunched on 9 May 1719. She was rebuilt for a second time at Plymouth according to the 1733 proposals of the 1719 Establishment, and relaunched on 8 October 1740. Kingston was present at the Battle of Toulon in 1744.

During the Seven Years' War, the ship was part of Admiral John Byng's squadron sent to relieve Fort St. Philip (Port Mahon) in 1756, besieged by a French amphibious force who had invaded the island of Menorca (historically called "Minorca" by the British). The squadron set sail from England on 10 April. On 2 May, it arrived at Gibraltar, departing on 8 May. On 19 May, it came into sight of Fort St. Philip. The French fleet then advanced to meet Byng. On 20 May, the squadron fought the Battle of Menorca where several British ships were seriously damaged but none was lost on either side. On 24 May, after a council of war, Byng gave orders to return to Gibraltar, abandoning Menorca to its fate. The squadron arrived at Gibraltar on 19 June.

In 1757, the ship was part of Admiral Holbourne's squadron which left Ireland on 5 May for the planned expedition against Louisbourg. By 10 July, the entire squadron was finally at anchor before Halifax where it made its junction with Hardy's squadron. However, in August, when the combined fleet was ready to set sail, Louisbourg had already been reinforced by three French squadrons and Governor Loudon cancelled the whole enterprise. Holbourne's squadron stayed off Louisbourg until 25 September when it was dispersed by a storm, forcing it to return to Great Britain in a very bad condition. On 20 November 1759, Kingston took part in the Battle of Quiberon Bay where the French navy suffered a great defeat.

As Lord Clive
The ship was sold to privateers linked to the East India Company on 14 January 1762 and renamed Lord Clive.

The same year during the Spanish-Portuguese War, 1761-1763, these privateers, fighting on the side of Portugal, had plans to conquer Spanish territory in South America and organised a raid on Buenos Aires and Montevideo.
Their squadron, under the command of John McNamara from the East India Company, consisted of Lord Clive (60), Ambuscade (40), two Portuguese ships (among which were the frigate Gloria (38)) transporting 500 infantry, and five storeships. On 2 November, the squadron sailed from Rio de Janeiro towards the mouth of the Río de la Plata but soon abandoned the project because Spanish defenders in both cities were fully alerted and well prepared.

On 6 January 1763, McNamara decided to attack and retake Colonia do Sacramento also in Spanish hands. 60-gun Lord Clive and the 40-gun HMS Ambuscade, along with 38-gun Portuguese Gloria, anchored near the city and started bombardment, but they received unexpected strong resistance from the city's gun battery. After three hours of an exchange of fire, a fire developed on Lord Clive that quickly progressed until it reached her magazine, which exploded, sinking her. There were 272 fatalities on board, including McNamara. HMS Ambuscade and Gloria were badly damaged too, and retired from combat.

Notes

References 

 
 Lavery, Brian (2003) The Ship of the Line - Volume 1: The development of the battlefleet 1650-1850. Conway Maritime Press. .
 Kingston (60). Project SYW. Retrieved 9 August 2008.
 Anonymous, A Complete History of the Present War, from its Commencement in 1756, to the End of the Campaign, 1760, London, 1761, pp. 202–205, 233-235
 Michael Phillips. Kingston (60) (1740). Michael Phillips' Ships of the Old Navy. Retrieved 9 August 2008.

External links
 

 

Ships of the line of the Royal Navy
1690s ships
Ships built on the Humber
Maritime incidents in 1763
Shipwrecks in rivers